Ranga Kumara Wimalawansa (born 17 April 1980) is a Sri Lankan former sprinter. He competed in the men's 4 × 400 metres relay at the 2000 Summer Olympics.

References

External links
 

1980 births
Living people
Athletes (track and field) at the 2000 Summer Olympics
Sri Lankan male sprinters
Olympic athletes of Sri Lanka
Athletes (track and field) at the 1998 Commonwealth Games
Athletes (track and field) at the 2002 Commonwealth Games
Commonwealth Games competitors for Sri Lanka
Place of birth missing (living people)
Asian Games medalists in athletics (track and field)
Asian Games bronze medalists for Sri Lanka
Athletes (track and field) at the 2002 Asian Games
Medalists at the 2002 Asian Games